Chinedu Andrew Obiekea (born 1985), better known as Andrew Jacked is a Nigerian IFBB professional bodybuilder, trainer and fitness influencer, residing in Dubai, UAE. His last victory was at the 2022 Arnold Classic in Birmingham, England. Obiekea first rose to prominence training with powerlifter, Larry Williams, before becoming one of the most notable bodybuilders of the 2020s, with a large yet classic physique that recalls the 'Golden Age' of bodybuilding over the mass physiques of the modern era.

Statistics

Offseason weight: 295 – 310 lbs (133.8 kg – 140.6 kg)
Precontest weight: 290 lbs
Height: 6’2.5” (189.42 cm)
Chest size: 48 inches
Bicep size: 23 inches
Waist: 32 inches
Age:	38 years
Nationality:	Nigerian

Early life and amateur career
Andrew Jacked Obiekea was born in Lagos, Nigeria in 1985, where he completed his education in Engineering, before working in various fields as an electrical engineer and military officer before switching to sport, first as a kickboxer and crossfit athlete. He moved to Dubai where he continued to train at the acclaimed Binous Gym.

Obiekea first came to prominence in 2018 as the training partner of American fitness influencer and powerlifter, Larry 'Wheels' Williams. Many of Williams' fans were impressed with Obiekea's physique and feats of strength while training, encouraging the then 34 year old to enter a bodybuilding show. Obieka quickly amassed over hundreds of thousand followers on Instagram as a result, with many Williams fans and other fitness enthusiasts drawn to his impressive 'amateur' physique. Obiekea competed in the inaugural EBBF Ajmaan Bodybuilding and Physique Contest in the UAE where he placed first in the competition, winning his IFFB Elite pro card at his very first bodybuilding show.

Professional career
The Nigerian bodybuilder won another IFBB Elite Pro League show just one week later. He switched to the IFBB Pro League and participated in the 2022 Arnold Classic Amateur. Another clear win at the show earned him the IFBB Pro card.

At this time, Obiekea's physique won him great acclaim among the bodybuilding community. Former competitors such as, Jay Cutler, Chris Cormier and Milos Sarcev predicted a bright future for Obiekea as his profile rose. The ensuing press brought Andrew Jacked into the spotlight not only for the hardcore bodybuilding community but more general and mainstream fitness enthusiasts.

On August 14, 2022, Andrew Jacked competed in and won the Texas Pro bodybuilding competition, qualifying for the Mr. Olympia contest and placing the him among the top open division bodybuilders in the IFBB. Having seemingly come from nowhere, he earned comparisons to the feats of Big Ramy nearly a decade earlier, though many critics doubted he could achieve the same level of success so early in his career.

It was unprecedented to for a competitor with so little professional competitive experience, to earn such a degree of expectation and excitement leading into a bodybuilding show. Despite the pressure, Andrew Jacked performed well in his Olympia debut, growing from 260lbs at his Arnold Classic debut to 290lbs at the 2022 Mr Olympia, while presenting an impressive physique. He placed eighth in the Men's Open division, ahead of top contender, William Bonac as well as fellow debutants Michael Krizanek and Blessing Awodibu.

Profile
Obiekea is renowned for his aesthetic physique which stands out from the larger and blockier mass physiques that have traditionally dominated the sport since the 1990s. At over 6'2' and 290lbs, he stands taller than most competitors, yet has chosen to present a more aesthetic look which he often presented through well choreographed posing routines that reminded many of the late Cedric McMillan as well as the great bodybuilders from the 1980s – a distinct contrast to mass monsters like Ronnie Coleman or Big Ramy. Obieka credits his relatively small waistline to dietary restrictions and food intolerances that limit him to about four meals and a shake per day, less than the norm for bodybuilders at the professional level.

With his combination of impressive size, height and aesthetic classic lines, Obiekea has achieved great success in a short amount of time . Indeed, the contrast between his pleasing physique and the larger mass monster look of other competitors such as Phil Heath has led some such as Milos Sarcev to proclaim him the future of the sport.

However, despite carrying the torch for a  more appealing look in the sport, set by the aforementioned McMillan, Andre Jacked has not yet reached the upper echelon of the bodybuilding ranks, failing to finish in the first callout of the Mr Olympia finals. The Olympia has traditionally rewarded the largest, most muscular physiques, placing the taller Obieka at a disadvantage. This is also a challenge that has been faced by bodybuilders of a similar physique and stature, such as McMillan, Evan Centopani and Patrick Moore.

Personal life
Andrew Jacked currently resides in Dubai, training at Binous Gym. Due to his large social media following, he is perhaps the first open bodybuilder to begin his career as a fitness influencer before delving into competition. Indeed, Obiekea has hundreds of thousands of followers on Youtube , Instagram and Tik-Tok, mirroring his former training partner, Williams. As of 2023, he now resides in the Los Angeles area in the offseason, training with Chris Lewis, former trainer to Shawn Rhoden, in Redondo Beach, CA. Along with bodybuilding, Obiekea's athleticism is showcased in his impressive flexibility and artistic talents showcased in his elaborate and choreographed posing routines.

Obiekea is currently in a relationship with Celine Leblanc, whom he met while residing in Dubai.

Competition history

 2021 EBBF Ajman Bodybuilding and Physique Contest – 1st (Earned the IFBB Elite Pro Card)
 IFBB Elite Pro League Show  – 1st
 2022 Arnold Classic Amateur – 1st (Earned the IFBB Pro Card)
 2022 Texas Pro – 1st (2022 Olympia Qualifier)
 2022 Arnold Classic UK – 1st
 2022 Mr. Olympia – 8th
 2023 Arnold Classic – (TBD)

See also
2022 Mr. Olympia
Mamdouh Elssbiay
Cedric McMillan

References 

1985 births
Nigerian bodybuilders
Nigerian military personnel
Professional bodybuilders
People from Dubai
Living people